Mathias Gallo Cassarino (born 19 December 1992) also known as Mathias 7MuayThaigym (มาเทียส เซเว่นมวยไทย) is an Italian Muay Thai fighter who is the former WPMF World Champion 135 lbs, WBC International Champion 135 lbs, and WMC "Muay Thai Against Drugs" Champion, Max Muay Thai 62 kg Silver Tournament Champion. October 2019 ranked number 2 at Lumpinee 140 lb. division

Biography
Mathias was born in Venaria Reale, Turin, Italy on 19 December 1992. He trains at 7 Muay Thai Gym in Rayong province, Thailand. Mathias started fighting Professional Muay Thai at 12 years old. He was featured on the program Tutte le Mattine in April 2006, his father Roberto was interviewed. On 24 April 2007 a specialized periodical published an article documenting Mathias' history. The Italian magazine Sport2.0 dedicated the first-page cover of the December 2010 issue to Mathias' training life. Mathias is a sponsored athlete.

At 17 years old Mathias won his first fight in Thailand against a Thai, on 15 August 2005.
 W.M.C. Muay Thai Against Drugs in Bangkok in front of 200,000 people on the occasion of HM Queen's Birthday at the Queen’s Cup 2010 in the program Thailand Vs. Challenger series (the only foreigner who won against a Thai that night).
He gained this title in Bangkok, on the occasion of HM Queen of Thailand's Birthday, 12 August 2010. Mathias was called again to fight for the HM Queen Birthday Sirikit where he actually fought in 2011. He won the Gold medal "57kg Junior" at WMF Championship.He won a bronze medal at I.F.M.A. World Muaythai Amateur Championships in Bangkok in the 60 kg Junior Category.
 When he was 18, he fought in the "Lumpinee Stadium" of Bangkok, Thailand, winning a K.O. against a Thai fighter (128 lbs).

Mathias also accepted fights in other disciplines, like Iranian wrestling, a mix of Judo and Karate. He won a Bronze medal in the Iranian Wrestling: Razmavaran World Championships 2010 at 60 kg.

On 14 April 2014 Mathias went to a draw with Thai Champion Rungravee Sasiprapa.

Mathias has fought against fighters around the world. Most of his opponents are Thai, but he has fought fighters from the Netherlands, Japan (he trained for two months for team Shobukai), China, Taipei, Russia, Belarus, Ukraine, Uzbekistan, Malaysia, France, Spain, Singapore, Israel, Cambodia, Afghanistan and Iran.

Mathias is ranked 2nd on the official WPMF 140 lbs (63.5 kg) world ranking (March 2015).

On 5 April 2015, Mathias won the Max Muay Thai 4 Man Silver Tournament, defeating the French Issam Arabat-Ziane in the semi-final and the Thai Puenyai Payyakka Mpan by KO R2 in the final.

On 12 September 2015, Mathias defeated Rungravee Sasiprapa at The Circle event held in Barcelona.

In 2018 Mathias became the first Italian ranked at Lumpinee Boxing stadium. He is one of the very few non-Thais fighters to appear in the ranking considered the most important in the world for Muay Thai

Titles
 2022 RWS final 4 - RWS: Rajadamnern World Series tournament 135 lb. 
 2017 SMM Sport Fight of The Year (vs Ronachai Parnsomboon)
 2015 Prince Cup trophy - Bangkok, Thailand
 2015 Max Muay Thai Silver Tournament Champion (-62 kg)
 2013 WPMF World (135 lbs) Champion
 2013 WBC Muay Thai International Champion (130 lbs)
 2012 Revolution Australian Champion (59 kg)
 2011 Prachuap Kirikan Province Champion (125 lbs)
 2010 WMC Muay Thai Against Drugs (58 kg) – Queen’s Cup
 2010 WMF Gold Medal (57 kg)
 2009 IFMA Bronze Medal (60 kg)

Muay Thai record

|-  style="background:#fbb;"
| 2022-11-25 || Loss ||align=left| Mongkolkaew Sor.Sommai || Rajadamnern World Series - Semi Final || Bangkok, Thailand || Decision (Split)|| 3 || 3:00 
|-  style="background:#fbb;"
| 2022-10-21|| Loss ||align=left| Buakhiao Por.Paoin  || Rajadamnern World Series - Group Stage || Bangkok, Thailand || Decision || 3 || 3:00 
|-  style="background:#cfc;"
| 2022-09-16||Win ||align=left| Dwi Sukarno  || Rajadamnern World Series - Group Stage || Bangkok, Thailand ||  TKO (leg injury/kick check) ||1  || 
|-  style="background:#cfc;"
| 2022-08-12||Win ||align=left| Flukenoi Kiatfahlikit  || Rajadamnern World Series - Group Stage || Bangkok, Thailand ||  Decision (split) ||3  ||3:00 
|-  style="background:#fbb;"
| 2020-06-15|| Loss ||align=left| Saeksan Or. Kwanmuang|| Palangmai, Rajadamnern Stadium || Bangkok, Thailand || Decision ||5 ||3:00
|-
|-  style="text-align:center; background:#fbb;"
|2022-02-06
|Loss
|align=left| Thepabut Kiatpech
|Kiatpetch, Rajadamnern Stadium
|Bangkok, Thailand
|Decision
|5
|3:00
|-
|-  style="text-align:center; background:#fbb;"
|2021-11-23
|Loss
|align=left| Lamnamoonlek Or.Atchariya
|Lumpinee GoSport
|Bangkok, Thailand
|Decision
|5
|3:00
|-
|-  style="text-align:center; background:#cfc;"
|2021-10-03
|Win
|align=left| Nakrob Fairtex
|Chang MuayThai Kiatpetch
|Buriram province, Thailand
|Decision
|5
|3:00
|-
|-  style="text-align:center; background:#cfc;"
|2020-11-20
|Win
|align=left| Prabsuek Si-Opal
|Petchaopraya, Rajadamnern Stadium
|Bangkok, Thailand
|Decision
|5
|3:00
|-
|-  style="text-align:center; background:#fbb;"
|2020-10-01
|Loss
|align=left| Petchlamsin Chor Haypayak 
| Singmawynn, Rajadamnern Stadium
|Bangkok, Thailand
|Decision
|5
|3:00
|-
|-  style="text-align:center; background:#fbb;"
|2020-08-06
|Loss
|align=left| Phetmanee Phor.Lakboon
|Sor.Sommai, Rajadamnern Stadium
|Bangkok, Thailand
|Decision
|5
|3:00
|-
|-  style="text-align:center; background:#cfc;"
|2020-02-14
|Win
|align=left| Chalamsuek Sitanothai
|Petchnumnoi, Lumpinee Stadium
|Bangkok
|TKO
|5
|3:00
|-
|-  style="text-align:center; background:#cfc;"
|2019-10-12
|Win
|align=left| Darky Lookmakhamwan 
|Kiatpetch, Lumpinee Stadium
|Bangkok
|Decision
|5
|3:00
|-
|-  style="text-align:center; background:#fbb;"
|2019-08-23
|Loss
|align=left| Darky Lookmakhamwan 
|Kiatpetch, Lumpinee Stadium
|Bangkok
|Decision
|5
|3:00
|-
|-  style="text-align:center; background:#fbb;"
|2019-07-20
|Loss
|align=left| Inseethong Or Peerapat 
|Kiatpetch, Lumpinee Stadium
|Bangkok
|Decision
|5
|3:00
|-
|-  style="text-align:center; background:#cfc;"
|2019-07-15
|Win
|align=left| Jaknaronglek Sor.Jullasen 
|TKO, Lumpinee Stadium
|Bangkok
|Decision
|5
|3:00
|-
|-  style="text-align:center; background:#fbb;"
|2019-03-17
|Loss
|align=left| Kiatpetch Suhanpeakmai 
|Kiatpetch, Or.Tor.Gor3 Stadium
|Nonthaburi province, Thailand
|Decision
|5
|3:00
|-
|-  style="text-align:center; background:#cfc;"
|2019-02-18
|Win
|align=left| Jaknaronglek Sor.Jullasen
|Kiatpetch, Or.Tor.Gor3 Stadium
|Nonthaburi province, Thailand
|KO
|5
|3:00
|-
|-  style="text-align:center; background:#fbb;"
|2018-11-30
|Loss
|align=left| Paedsaenlek Rachanon 
|Petchnumnoi, Lumpinee Stadium
|Bangkok
|Decision
|5
|3:00
|-
|-  style="text-align:center; background:#cfc;"
|2018-08-28
|Win
|align=left| Diesellek MUden
|PetchNumnoi, Lumpinee Stadium
|Bangkok, Thailand
|Decision
|5
|3:00
|-
|-  style="text-align:center; background:#fbb;"
|2018-06-30
|Loss
|align=left| Pinpetch Sitjaedang
|TKO Lumpinee Stadium
|Bangkok, Thailand
|Decision
|5
|3:00
|-
|-  style="text-align:center; background:#cfc;"
|2018-05-05|| Win ||align=left|  Runachai Parnsomboon || TKO, Lumpinee Stadium || Bangkok || KO ||4|| 2:00
|-
|-  style="text-align:center; background:#cfc;"
|24-02-2018|| Win ||align=left| Mongkolpetch Dabpong 191 || Kiatpetch, Lumpinee Stadium|| Bangkok || Points 
||5|| 3:00

|-
|-  style="text-align:center; background:#fbb;"
|30-12-2017|| Loss ||align=left| Victor Conesa ||  Phetchbuncha Samui Stadium || Ko Samui, Bangkok || TKO (Doctor stoppage) ||3|| 

|-
|-  style="text-align:center; background:#cfc;"
|2017-11-25|| Win ||align=left| Runachai Parnsomboon || Lumpinee TKO – 64,5 Kg || Bangkok || TKO ||5|| 3:00

|-
|-  style="text-align:center; background:#cfc;"
| 2017-09-23 || Win ||align=left| Wangtong Sitpanancherng ||  Lumpinee TKO – 62 Kg  || Bangkok || KO ||2|| 1:00

|-
|-  style="text-align:center; background:#cfc;"
| 2017-08-20 || Win ||align=left| Yodwatchara Fairtex || ALL STAR FIGHT || Bangkok, Thailand || TKO ||2|| 2:00

|-
|-  style="text-align:center; background:#fbb;"
| 2017-06-09 || Loss ||align=left| Petchdamlek Sor Yingjaroenkanchang || Lumpinee Champions show 64 Kg  || Bangkok ||Decision
|5|| 3:00

|-
|-  style="text-align:center; background:#fbb;"
| 2017-01-28 || Loss ||align=left| Brice Delval|| Thai Boxe Mania -63,5 kg || Torino, Italy || Decision ||5|| 3:00

|-
|-  style="text-align:center; background:#fbb;"
| 2016-11-27 || Loss ||align=left| Rungravee Sasiprapa || Top King World Series 11 -63,5 kg Title Fight || China || Decision ||3|| 3:00

|-
|-  style="text-align:center; background:#fbb;"
| 2016-08-26 || Loss ||align=left| Yodtuantong Petchyindee Academy || Toyota Marathon -65 kg  || Khon Kaen, Thailand || TKO ||1|| 1:00
|-
|-  style="text-align:center; background:#cfc;"
| 2016-08-26 || Win ||align=left| Kiangkrai Tor Silachai || Toyota Marathon -65 kg  || Khon Kaen, Thailand || Decision ||3|| 3:00
|-
|-  style="text-align:center; background:#fbb;"
| 2016-07-23 || Loss ||align=left| Katsushi Nakagawa || NJKF 2016 5th  || Tokyo, Japan || Decision ||5||3:00
|-
|-  style="text-align:center; background:#cfc;"
| 2016-05-29 || Win ||align=left| Markleak Sititisukato || Super Muay Thai  || Bangkok, Thailand || Decision || 3 || 3:00
|-
|-  style="text-align:center; background:#cfc;"
| 2016-04-12 || Win ||align=left| Tongsak Lukmaklamwan || Lumpinee Stadium  || Bangkok, Thailand || TKO || 4 ||2:00
|-
|-  style="text-align:center; background:#c5d2ea
| 2016-02-28 || Draw ||align=left| Weerachai Meenayothin || Super Muay Thai  || Bangkok, Thailand || Decision || 3 || 3:00
|-
|-  style="text-align:center; background:#cfc;"
| 2015-12-12 || Win ||align=left| Suedam Khongsittha || Super Muay Thai  || Bangkok, Thailand || Decision || 3 || 3:00
|-
|-  style="text-align:center; background:#fbb;"
| 2015-30-10 || Loss ||align=left| Aranchai Kiatpatarapan || Toyota Marathon -64 kg || Nakhon Ratchasima, Thailand || Decision || 3 || 3:00
|-
|-  style="text-align:center; background:#cfc;"
| 2015-03-10 || Win ||align=left| Jeferson Oliveira || Xtreme Muay Thai 2015 || The Venetian Macao, Macao || Decision || 3 || 3:00
|-
|-  style="text-align:center; background:#cfc;"
| 2015-12-09 || Win ||align=left| Rungravee Sasiprapa || The Circle || Barcelona, Spain || Decision || 3 || 3:00
|-
|-  style="text-align:center; background:#cfc;"
| 2015-25-07 || Win ||align=left| Alexander Arutyunyan || WPMF Prince Cup || Bangkok, Thailand || Decision || 5 || 3:00
|-
|-  style="text-align:center; background:#cfc;"
| 2015-05-06 || Win ||align=left| Mongkon Kor.Kampanaj || Lumpinee Stadium || Bangkok, Thailand || Decision || 5 || 3:00
|-
|-  style="text-align:center; background:#cfc;"
| 2015-04-05 || Win ||align=left| Puenyai Payyakka Mpan || Max Muay Thai|| Pattaya, Thailand || KO || 2 || 2:00
|-
|-  style="text-align:center; background:#cfc;"
| 2015-04-05 || Win ||align=left| Issam Arabat-Ziane || Max Muay Thai|| Pattaya, Thailand || Decision || 3 || 3:00
|-
|-  style="text-align:center; background:#fbb;"
| 2015-02-07 || Loss ||align=left| Ayoub El Khaidar || La Nuit des Titans 2015 || Tours, France || Decision || 5 || 3:00
|-
|-  style="text-align:center; background:#cfc;"
| 2015-01-03 || Win ||align=left| Cambodian Fighter || Open Stadium || Nakhon Ratchasima, Thailand || KO ||3||3:00
|-
|-  style="text-align:center; background:#fbb;"
| 2014-10-05 || Loss ||align=left| Tongtang Muangseema || Max Muay Thai World || Pattaya, Thailand || TKO || 2 || 2:00
|-
|-  style="text-align:center; background:#fbb;"
| 2014-08-15 || Loss ||align=left| Captain Ken Pinsinchai || H.M. Queens Birthday 2014 - Sanam Luang || Bangkok, Thailand || Decision || 5 || 3:00
|-
! style=background:white colspan=9 |
|-  style="text-align:center; background:#cfc;"
| 2014-06-22 || Win ||align=left| Denkiri Sor. Sommai || MAX Muay Thai Live || Pattaya, Thailand || Decision || 3 || 3:00
|-
|-  style="text-align:center; background:#cfc;"
| 2014-05-11 || Win ||align=left| Denkiri Sor. Sommai || MAX Muay Thai Live || Bangkok, Thailand || Decision || 3 || 3:00
|-
|-  style="text-align:center; background:#c5d2ea
| 2014-04-14 || Draw ||align=left| Rungravee Sasiprapa || Combat Banchamek || Surin, Thailand || Decision || 3 || 3:00
|-
|-  style="text-align:center; background:#cfc;"
| 2014-03-29 || Win ||align=left| Petchaiya Sor Sirynia || MAX Muay Thai 7 || Bangkok, Thailand || Decision || 3 || 3:00
|-
|-  style="text-align:center; background:#fbb;"
| 2014-02-07 || Loss ||align=left| Igor Klimovich || RusThai Promotions || Pattaya, Thailand || Decision || 3 || 3:00
|-
|-  style="text-align:center; background:#cfc;"
| 2014-01-03 || Win ||align=left| ChokDee Lappet Ubon || Yokkao 6 || Pattaya, Thailand || TKO || 3 || 3:00
|-
|-  style="text-align:center; background:#cfc;"
| 2013-12-10 || Win ||align=left| Sapanpetch Sit Ititsukato || MAX Muay Thai: The Final Chapter || Khon Khaen, Thailand || Decision || 3 || 3:00
|-
|-  style="text-align:center; background:#fbb;"
| 2013-11-10 || Loss ||align=left| Mungkornpet Dragon GYM || Bangla Stadium || Phuket, Thailand || Decision || 5 || 3:00
|-
|-  style="text-align:center; background:#cfc;"
| 2013-07-26 || Win ||align=left| Juan Mario Kaewsamrit || 61st Birth Anniversary of HRH The Crown Prince of Thailand || Bangkok, Thailand || Decision (unanimous) || 5 || 3:00
|-
! style=background:white colspan=9 |

|-  style="text-align:center; background:#fbb;"
| 2013-07-05 || Loss ||align=left| Kemtong S. Baramee || Boxing World Pattaya || Pattaya, Thailand || Decision || 5 || 3:00
|-
|-  style="text-align:center; background:#fbb;"
| 2013-05-31 || Loss ||align=left| Anvar Boynazarov || Toyota Marathon 63 kg || Kanchanaburi, Thailand || Decision ||3|| 3:00
|-
|-  style="text-align:center; background:#fbb;"
| 2013-05-02 || Loss ||align=left| Jomkitti Lukbarnyai || Thepprasit Stadium || Pattaya, Thailand || Decision || 5 || 3:00
|-
|-  style="text-align:center; background:#cfc;"
| 2013-04-08 || Win ||align=left|  || Thepprasit Stadium || Pattaya, Thailand || Decision || 5 || 3:00
|-
|-  style="text-align:center; background:#cfc;"
| 2013-01-05 || Win ||align=left| Van Chan Seth || Ko in Koh Chang || Koh Chang, Thailand || Decision || 5 || 3:00
|-
! style=background:white colspan=9 |
|-  style="text-align:center; background:#cfc;"
| 2012-12-15 || Win ||align=left| Silatong Mor Watanachai || Lumpinee Stadium || Bangkok, Thailand || TKO || 5 || 1:00
|-
|-  style="text-align:center; background:#cfc;"
| 2012-11-06 || Win ||align=left| Yukiya Nakamura || Lumpinee Stadium || Bangkok, Thailand || Decision || 5 || 3:00
|-
|-  style="text-align:center; background:#cfc;"
| 2012-10-09 || Win ||align=left| Nin Lookmakarmwan || Lumpinee Stadium || Bangkok, Thailand || Decision || 5 || 3:00
|-
|-  style="text-align:center; background:#cfc;"
| 2012-09-04 || Win ||align=left| Mongkondam Sitwarunee || Lumpinee Stadium || Bangkok, Thailand || Decision || 5 || 3:00
|-
|-  style="text-align:center; background:#cfc;"
| 2012-08-01 || Win ||align=left| Insiekaow Kiatboonmee || Boxing World Pattaya || Pattaya, Thailand || TKO  || 3 || 2:00
|-
|-  style="text-align:center; background:#cfc;"
| 2012-07-07 || Win ||align=left| Joe Concha || Revolution Muay Thai || Sydney, Australia || TKO (Cuts) || 4 || 3:00
|-
|-  style="text-align:center; background:#fbb;"
| 2012-05-18 || Loss ||align=left| Dieselnoi Sitkhrupian  || Lumpinee Stadium || Bangkok, Thailand || Decision || 5 || 3:00
|-
|-  style="text-align:center; background:#fbb;"
| 2012-04-17 || Loss ||align=left| Kemarat Sitjapae  || Thai Fight Extreme || Pattaya, Thailand || Decision || 3 || 3:00
|-
|-  style="text-align:center; background:#fbb;"
| 2012-03-21 || Loss||align=left| Nguyễn Trần Duy Nhất  || WMF Pro-am World Championship Semifinal || Bangkok, Thailand || Decision || 3 || 3:00
|-
|-  style="text-align:center; background:#cfc;"
| 2012-03-21 || Win ||align=left| Majid  || WMF Pro-am World Championship Quarterfinal || Bangkok, Thailand || Decision || 3 || 3:00
|-
|-  style="text-align:center; background:#cfc;"
| 2012-01-21 || Win ||align=left| Sangchan Na Pattaya  || Thepprasit Fairtex Stadium Pattaya || Pattaya, Thailand || TKO || 3 || 2:00
|-
|-  style="text-align:center; background:#cfc;"
| 2011-12-05 || Win ||align=left| Prabpram Sit Japow || Thepprasit Fairtex Stadium Pattaya || Pattaya, Thailand || TKO || 2 || 1:00
|-
|-  style="text-align:center; background:#cfc;"
| 2011-10-07 || Win ||align=left|  || Thepprasit Fairtex Stadium Pattaya || Pattaya, Thailand || Decision || 5 || 3:00
|-
|-  style="text-align:center; background:#cfc;"
| 2011-09-26 || Win ||align=left| Royto Sor.Sopa || Thepprasit Fairtex Stadium Pattaya || Pattaya, Thailand || Decision || 5 || 3:00
|-
|-  style="text-align:center; background:#fbb;"
| 2011-08-12 || Loss ||align=left| Chanachai Or Bor Tor Lampongtammy || Queen's Cup 2011: Thailand vs Challenger || Bangkok, Thailand || Decision || 5 || 3:00
|-
|-  style="text-align:center; background:#fbb;"
| 2011-04-15 || Loss ||align=left| Phetbaanrai Or.Wongsri || Lumpinee Stadium || Bangkok, Thailand || TKO (injury) || 3 || 1:30
|-
|-  style="text-align:center; background:#cfc;"
| 2011-03-05 || Win ||align=left| Chartpayak Sit-Ajarnmanote || Lumpinee Stadium || Bangkok, Thailand || TKO (low kick) || 2 || 2:10
|-
|-  style="text-align:center; background:#cfc;"
| 2011-01-08 || Win ||align=left| Urkam Sasiprapa Gym || The Champions Club 6 || Pattaya, Thailand || Decision || 5 || 3:00
|-
|-  style="text-align:center; background:#cfc;"
| 2010-12-23 || Win ||align=left| || Thepprasit Fairtex Stadium || Pattaya, Thailand || Decision || 5 || 3:00
|-
|-  style="text-align:center; background:#c5d2ea
| 2010-09-11 || Draw ||align=left| || Live Cambodian TV || Phnom Pehn, Cambodia || Decision || 5 || 3:00
|-
|-  style="text-align:center; background:#cfc;"
| 2010-08-12 || Win ||align=left| Khunlar Chokepreecha || Queen's Cup 2010: Thailand vs Challenger || Bangkok, Thailand || Decision || 5 || 3:00
|-
|-  style="text-align:center; background:#fbb;"
| 2010-07-29 || Loss ||align=left|  || Thepprasit Fairtex Stadium || Pattaya, Thailand || Decision || 5 || 3:00
|-
|-  style="text-align:center; background:#fbb;"
| 2010-06-13 || Loss ||align=left| Eakkarat  || Windy Super Fights || Tokyo, Japan || Decision || 3 || 3:00
|-
|-  style="text-align:center; background:#c5d2ea
| 2010-04-25 || Draw ||align=left| Reo  || Muay Lok Promotion || Tokyo, Japan || Decision || 3 || 3:00
|-
|-  style="text-align:center; background:#cfc;"
| 2010-03-05 || Win ||align=left| Jason Wong  || Libogen Fight Night part 13 || Hong Kong || Decision || 5 || 2:00
|-
|-  style="text-align:center; background:#cfc;"
| 2010-01-17 || Win ||align=left| Irhi Sit Shuki (Gil Saat)  || Tard Khong Panding Stadium || Bangkok, Thailand || Decision || 5 || 3:00
|-
|-  style="text-align:center; background:#fbb;"
| 2009-10-10 || Loss ||align=left|  || Libogen Fight Night || Hong Kong || Decision || 3 || 3:00
|-
|-  style="text-align:center; background:#c5d2ea
| 2009-08-06 || Draw ||align=left| Leonard Nganga || Thepprasit Fairtex Stadium || Pattaya, Thailand || Decision || 5 || 3:00
|-
|-  style="text-align:center; background:#fbb;"
| 2009-07-18 || Loss ||align=left| Eckachai Shothippawan ||  || Pattaya, Thailand || Decision || 5 || 3:00
|-
|-  style="text-align:center; background:#cfc;"
| 2009-02-08 || Win ||align=left| Rajchawat S.Jaratfha || Thepprasit Fairtex Stadium || Pattaya, Thailand || TKO || 4 || 2:40
|-
|-  style="text-align:center; background:#cfc;"
| 2008-11-17 || Win ||align=left| Fauzan Zabidi || 2009 TM-WMC-KL International Muaythai Challenge || Kuala Lumpur, Malaysia || TKO || 4 || 2:20
|-
|-  style="text-align:center; background:#fbb;"
| 2008-09-27 || Loss ||align=left| Richmond Leong || S1 Singapore International Muay Thai Championship || Singapore || Decision || 5 || 3:00
|-
|-  style="text-align:center; background:#fbb;"
| 2008-08-07 || Loss ||align=left| Rajchawat S.Jaratfha || Thepprasit Fairtex Stadium || Pattaya, Thailand || Decision || 5 || 3:00
|-  style="text-align:center; background:#fbb;"
| 2008-07-21 || Loss ||align=left|  || Thepprasit Fairtex Stadium || Pattaya, Thailand || Decision || 5 || 3:00
|-  style="text-align:center; background:#cfc;"
| 2008-07-07 || Win ||align=left|  || Thepprasit Fairtex Stadium || Pattaya, Thailand || TKO || 4 ||
|-  style="text-align:center; background:#cfc;"
| 2007-12-30 || Win ||align=left| Por. Pramuk Gym || Thepprasit Fairtex Stadium || Pattaya, Thailand || KO (knee) || 5 || 1:00
|-  style="text-align:center; background:#cfc;"
| 2007-07-26 || Win ||align=left| Albert Kraus Gym || Thepprasit Fairtex Stadium || Pattaya, Thailand || Decision || 5        || 2:00
|-  style="text-align:center; background:#cfc;"
| 2007-04-16 || Win ||align=left|  || Thepprasit Fairtex Stadium || Pattaya, Thailand || Decision || 5 || 3:00
|-  style="text-align:center; background:#cfc;"
| 2005-08-15 || Win ||align=left| Petsiwa || Lamai Stadium || Koh Samui, Thailand || Decision || 5 || 3:00
|-
| colspan=9 | Legend:

References

External links

WBC Muay Thai official ranking
WPMF official ranking
Official website

1992 births
Living people
Italian male kickboxers
Italian Muay Thai practitioners